Kropp is a former Amt ("collective municipality") in the district of Schleswig-Flensburg, in Schleswig-Holstein, Germany. The seat of the Amt was in Kropp. On 1 January 2008, it was merged with the Amt Stapelholm to form the Amt Kropp-Stapelholm.

The Amt Kropp consisted of the following municipalities:

Alt Bennebek (355) 
Börm (764) 
Dörpstedt (549) 
Groß Rheide (1037) 
Klein Bennebek (587) 
Klein Rheide (357) 
Kropp (6416) 
Tetenhusen (945)

Former Ämter in Schleswig-Holstein